The 2023 NHL Entry Draft will be the 61st NHL Entry Draft. The draft is expected to be held on June 28–29, 2023, at Bridgestone Arena in Nashville, Tennessee.

Eligibility
Ice hockey players born between January 1, 2003, and September 15, 2005, are eligible for selection in the 2023 NHL Entry Draft. Additionally, un-drafted, non-North American players born in 2002 are eligible for the draft; and those players who were drafted in the 2021 NHL Entry Draft, but not signed by an NHL team and who were born after June 30, 2003, are also eligible to re-enter the draft.

Draft lottery
Beginning with the 2014–15 NHL season the NHL changed the weighting system that was used in previous years. Under the new system the odds of winning the draft lottery for the four lowest finishing teams in the league decreased, while the odds for the other non-playoff teams increased. As the league reduced the number of lottery drawings before the 2021–22 season, the first two picks overall are awarded after two rounds starting with the 2021 draft, and since the 2022 lottery, the teams winning one of the two drawings are allowed to move up a maximum of ten spots in the draft order and a team is only allowed to win the lottery twice in a five-year period. The draft lottery will be held on May 8, 2023.

Top prospects

Source: NHL Central Scouting (January 13, 2023) ranking.

Traded picks
The order of the 2023 Entry Draft will be finalized upon the conclusion of the 2022–23 NHL season. However, some teams have already exchanged picks for this draft via trade. These picks are listed below.

Round one
 The Boston Bruins' first-round pick will go to the Toronto Maple Leafs as the result of a trade on February 28, 2023, that sent Rasmus Sandin to Washington in exchange for Erik Gustafsson and this pick.
Washington previously acquired this pick as the result of a trade on February 23, 2023, that sent Garnet Hathaway and Andrei Svetlakov to Boston in exchange for Craig Smith, a third-round pick in 2024, a second-round pick in 2025 and this pick.
 The Edmonton Oilers' first-round pick will go to the Nashville Predators as the result of a trade on February 28, 2023, that sent Mattias Ekholm and a sixth-round pick in 2024 to Edmonton in exchange for Tyson Barrie, Reid Schaefer, a fourth-round pick in 2024 and this pick.
 The Florida Panthers' first-round pick will go to the Montreal Canadiens as the result of a trade on March 16, 2022, that sent Ben Chiarot to Florida in exchange for Ty Smilanic, a conditional fourth-round pick in 2022 and this pick (being conditional at the time of the trade). The condition – Montreal will receive a first-round pick in 2023 if Florida's first-round pick in 2022 is outside of the top ten selections – was converted when the Panthers qualified for the 2022 Stanley Cup playoffs on April 3, 2022.
 The Toronto Maple Leafs' first-round pick will go to the St. Louis Blues as the result of a trade on February 17, 2023, that sent Noel Acciari and Josh Pillar to Toronto in exchange for Adam Gaudette, Mikhail Abramov, Ottawa's third-round pick in 2023, a second-round pick in 2024 and this pick.

Round two
 The Boston Bruins' second-round pick will go to the Anaheim Ducks as the result of a trade on March 19, 2022, that sent Hampus Lindholm and Kodie Curran to Boston in exchange for Urho Vaakanainen, John Moore, a first-round pick in 2022, a second-round pick in 2024 and this pick.
 The Colorado Avalanche's second-round pick will go to the Anaheim Ducks as the result of a trade on March 14, 2022, that sent Josh Manson to Colorado in exchange for Drew Helleson and this pick.
 The Ottawa Senators' second-round pick will go to the Chicago Blackhawks as the result of a trade on February 22, 2023, that sent future considerations to Ottawa in exchange for Nikita Zaitsev, a fourth-round pick in 2026 and this pick.
 The Pittsburgh Penguins' second-round pick will go to the Nashville Predators as the result of a trade on March 1, 2023, that sent Mikael Granlund to Pittsburgh in exchange for this pick.
 The Philadelphia Flyers' second-round pick will go to the Buffalo Sabres as the result of a trade on July 23, 2021, that sent Rasmus Ristolainen to Philadelphia in exchange for Robert Hagg, a first-round pick in 2021 and this pick.
 The St. Louis Blues' second-round pick will go to the Detroit Red Wings as the result of a trade on March 21, 2022, that sent Nick Leddy and Luke Witkowski to St. Louis in exchange for Oskar Sundqvist, Jake Walman and this pick.
 The Tampa Bay Lightning's second-round pick will go to the Chicago Blackhawks as the result of a trade on July 27, 2021, that sent Brent Seabrook to Tampa Bay in exchange for Tyler Johnson and this pick.
 The Toronto Maple Leafs' second-round pick will go to the Seattle Kraken as the result of a trade on March 20, 2022, that sent Mark Giordano and Colin Blackwell to Toronto in exchange for a second-round pick in 2022, a third-round pick in 2024 and this pick.
 The Vancouver Canucks' second-round pick will go to the Detroit Red Wings as the result of a trade on March 1, 2023, that sent Filip Hronek and a fourth-round pick in 2023 to Vancouver in exchange for the Islanders' conditional first-round in 2023 and this pick.
 The Vegas Golden Knights' second-round pick will go to the Minnesota Wild as the result of a trade on March 3, 2023, that sent Jordan Greenway to Buffalo in exchange for a fifth-round pick in 2024 and this pick.
Buffalo previously acquired this pick as the result of a trade on November 4, 2021, that sent Jack Eichel and a conditional third-round pick in 2023 to Vegas in exchange for Alex Tuch, Peyton Krebs, a conditional first-round pick in 2022 and this pick (being conditional at the time of the trade). The condition – Buffalo will receive a second-round pick in 2023 if Vegas' first-round pick in 2022 is outside of the top ten selections – was converted when the Golden Knights did not win either draw in the 2022 draft lottery on May 10, 2022.
 The Winnipeg Jets' second-round pick will go to the Seattle Kraken as the result of a trade on July 28, 2021, that sent Vitek Vanecek to Washington in exchange for this pick.
Washington previously acquired this pick as the result of a trade on July 26, 2021, that sent Brenden Dillon to Winnipeg in exchange for a second-round pick in 2022 and this pick.

Round three
 The Buffalo Sabres' third-round pick will go to the Vegas Golden Knights as the result of a trade on November 4, 2021, that sent Alex Tuch, Peyton Krebs, a conditional first-round pick in 2022 and a conditional second-round pick in 2023 to Buffalo in exchange for Jack Eichel and this pick (being conditional at the time of the trade). The condition – Vegas will receive a third-round pick in 2023 if Vegas' first-round pick in 2022 is outside of the top ten selections – was converted when the Golden Knights did not win either draw in the 2022 draft lottery on May 10, 2022.
 The Calgary Flames' third-round pick will go to the Columbus Blue Jackets as the result of a trade on July 22, 2022, that sent Oliver Bjorkstrand to Seattle in exchange for Winnipeg's fourth-round pick in 2023 and this pick.
Seattle previously acquired this pick as the result of a trade on March 16, 2022, that sent Calle Jarnkrok to Calgary in exchange for Florida's second-round pick in 2022, a seventh-round pick in 2024 and this pick.
 The Colorado Avalanche's third-round pick will go to the New York Rangers as the result of a trade on July 7, 2022, that sent Alexandar Georgiev to Colorado in exchange for a third and fifth-round pick both in 2022 and this pick.
 The Dallas Stars' third-round pick will go to the Chicago Blackhawks as the result of a trade on July 8, 2022, that sent Edmonton's third-round pick in 2022 to Arizona in exchange for this pick.
Arizona previously acquired this pick as the result of a trade on March 20, 2022, that sent Scott Wedgewood to Dallas in exchange for this pick (being conditional at the time of the trade). The condition – Arizona will receive a third-round pick in 2023 if Dallas qualifies for the 2022 Stanley Cup playoffs – was converted on April 27, 2022.
 The Edmonton Oilers' third-round pick will go to the Arizona Coyotes as the result of a trade on March 2, 2023, that sent Nick Bjugstad and Cam Dineen to Edmonton in exchange for Michael Kesselring and this pick.
 The Florida Panthers' third-round pick will go to the Philadelphia Flyers as the result of a trade on March 19, 2022, that sent Claude Giroux, German Rubtsov, Connor Bunnaman and a fifth-round pick in 2024 to Florida in exchange for Owen Tippett, a conditional first-round pick in 2024 and this pick.
 The Los Angeles Kings' third-round pick will go to the Buffalo Sabres as the result of a trade on March 1, 2023, that sent Erik Portillo to Los Angeles in exchange for this pick.
 The Minnesota Wild's third-round pick will go to the Anaheim Ducks as the result of a trade on March 19, 2022, that sent Nicolas Deslauriers to Minnesota in exchange for this pick.
 The New Jersey Devils' third-round pick will go to the Pittsburgh Penguins as the result of a trade on July 16, 2022, that sent John Marino to New Jersey in exchange for Ty Smith and this pick.
 The New York Islanders' third-round pick will go to the Arizona Coyotes as the result of a trade on July 17, 2021, that sent future considerations to New York in exchange for Andrew Ladd, Colorado's second-round pick in 2021, a conditional second-round pick in 2022, and this pick (being conditional at the time of the trade). The condition – Arizona will receive a third-round pick in 2023 if Ladd plays in at least one professional game while under contract to the Coyotes during the 2022–23 season – was converted when Ladd failed his physical and was placed on long-term injured reserve on September 22, 2022.
 The New York Rangers' third-round pick will go to the Philadelphia Flyers as the result of a trade on March 21, 2022, that sent Justin Braun to New York in exchange for this pick.
 The Ottawa Senators' third-round pick will go to the St. Louis Blues as the result of a trade on February 17, 2023, that sent Noel Acciari and Josh Pillar to Toronto in exchange for Adam Gaudette, Mikhail Abramov, a first-round pick in 2023, a second-round pick in 2024 and this pick.
Toronto previously acquired this pick as the result of a trade on July 11, 2022, that sent future considerations to Ottawa in exchange for Matt Murray, a seventh-round pick in 2024 and this pick.
 The Pittsburgh Penguins' third-round pick will go to the Los Angeles Kings as the result of a trade on April 12, 2021, that sent Jeff Carter to Pittsburgh in exchange for a conditional third-round pick in 2022 and this pick (being conditional at the time of the trade). The condition – Los Angeles will receive a third-round pick in 2023 if Carter plays in 50 or more games for Pittsburgh during the 2021–22 NHL season – was converted on March 3, 2022.
 The San Jose Sharks' third-round pick will go to the Nashville Predators as the result of a trade on July 8, 2022, that sent Luke Kunin to San Jose in exchange for John Leonard and this pick.
 The Tampa Bay Lightning's third-round pick will go to the Nashville Predators as the result of a trade on February 26, 2023, that sent Tanner Jeannot to Tampa Bay in exchange for Cal Foote, a conditional first-round pick in 2025, a second-round pick in 2024, a fourth and fifth-round pick both in 2023 and this pick.
 The Toronto Maple Leafs' third-round pick will go to the Vancouver Canucks as the result of a trade on February 28, 2023, that sent Luke Schenn to Toronto in exchange for this pick.
 The Washington Capitals' third-round pick will go to the Arizona Coyotes as the result of a trade on March 21, 2022, that sent Johan Larsson to Washington in exchange for this pick.

Round four
 The Colorado Avalanche's fourth-round pick will go to the Seattle Kraken as the result of a trade on July 27, 2021, that sent Kurtis MacDermid to Colorado in exchange for this pick.
 The Detroit Red Wings' fourth-round pick will go to the Vancouver Canucks as the result of a trade on March 1, 2023 that sent the Islanders' conditional first-round pick and a second-round pick both in 2023 to Detroit in exchange for Filip Hronek and this pick.
 The Edmonton Oilers' fourth-round pick will go to the Philadelphia Flyers as the result of a trade on March 21, 2022, that sent Derick Brassard to Edmonton in exchange for this pick.
 The Minnesota Wild's fourth-round pick will go to the Detroit Red Wings as the result of a trade on March 3, 2023, that sent Oskar Sundqvist to Minnesota in exchange for this pick.
 The New York Rangers' fourth-round pick will go to the Vancouver Canucks as the result of a trade on March 21, 2022, that sent Tyler Motte to New York in exchange for this pick.
 The Pittsburgh Penguins' fourth-round pick will go to the Montreal Canadiens as the result of a trade on July 16, 2022, that sent Jeff Petry and Ryan Poehling to Pittsburgh in exchange for Mike Matheson and this pick.
 The Tampa Bay Lightning's fourth-round pick will go to the Nashville Predators as the result of a trade on February 26, 2023, that sent Tanner Jeannot to Tampa Bay in exchange for Cal Foote, a conditional first-round pick in 2025, a second-round pick in 2024, a third and fifth-round pick both in 2023 and this pick.
 The Toronto Maple Leafs' fourth-round pick will go to the Nashville Predators as the result of a trade on July 8, 2022, that sent Toronto's fourth-round pick in 2022 to Toronto in exchange for this pick.
 The Vegas Golden Knights' fourth-round pick will go to the Montreal Canadiens as the result of a trade on July 8, 2022, that sent Tampa Bay's fourth-round pick in 2022 to Vegas in exchange for this pick.
 The Winnipeg Jets' fourth-round pick will go to the Columbus Blue Jackets as the result of a trade on July 22, 2022, that sent Oliver Bjorkstrand to Seattle in exchange for Calgary's third-round pick in 2023 and this pick.
Seattle previously acquired this pick as the result of a trade on March 20, 2022, that sent Mason Appleton to Winnipeg in exchange for this pick.

Round five
 The Boston Bruins' fifth-round pick will go to the Columbus Blue Jackets as the result of a trade on February 28, 2023, that sent Gustav Nyquist to Minnesota in exchange for this pick.
Minnesota previously acquired this pick as the result of a trade on February 23, 2023, that sent Dmitry Orlov to Boston in exchange for this pick.
 The Calgary Flames' fifth-round pick will go to the Montreal Canadiens as the result of a trade on February 14, 2022, that sent Tyler Toffoli to Calgary in exchange for Tyler Pitlick, Emil Heineman, a conditional first-round pick in 2022, a conditional fourth-round pick in 2024 and this pick.
 The Columbus Blue Jackets' fifth-round pick will go to the San Jose Sharks as the result of a trade on July 8, 2022, that sent Buffalo's fifth-round pick in 2022 to Columbus in exchange for this pick.
 The New York Rangers' fifth-round pick will go to the Winnipeg Jets as the result of a trade on March 21, 2022, that sent Andrew Copp and a sixth-round pick in 2023 to New York in exchange for Morgan Barron, two conditional second-round picks in 2022 and this pick.
 The Tampa Bay Lightning's fifth-round pick will go to the Nashville Predators as the result of a trade on February 26, 2023, that sent Tanner Jeannot to Tampa Bay in exchange for Cal Foote, a conditional first-round pick in 2025, a second-round pick in 2024, a third and fourth-round pick both in 2023 and this pick.
 The Vancouver Canucks' fifth-round pick will go to the Carolina Hurricanes as the result of a trade on October 28, 2022, that sent Ethan Bear and Lane Pederson to Vancouver in exchange for this pick.
 The Vegas Golden Knights' fifth-round pick will go to the Arizona Coyotes as the result of a trade on February 22, 2023, that sent Dysin Mayo to Vegas in exchange for Shea Weber and this pick.

Round six
 The Chicago Blackhawks' sixth-round pick will go to the Carolina Hurricanes as the result of a trade on July 8, 2022, that sent a sixth-round pick in 2022 to Chicago in exchange for this pick.
 The Columbus Blue Jackets' sixth-round pick will go to the Arizona Coyotes as the result of a trade on March 2, 2023, that sent Jon Gillies to Arizona in exchange for Jakub Voracek and this pick.
 The Ottawa Senators' sixth-round pick will go to the Philadelphia Flyers as the result of a trade on March 3, 2023, that sent Patrick Brown to Ottawa in exchange for this pick.
 The Washington Capitals' sixth-round pick will go to the Seattle Kraken as the result of a trade on March 21, 2022, that sent Marcus Johansson to Washington in exchange for Daniel Sprong, a fourth-round pick in 2022 and this pick.
 The Winnipeg Jets' sixth-round pick will go to the New York Rangers as the result of a trade on March 21, 2022, that sent Morgan Barron, two conditional second-round picks in 2022 and a fifth-round pick in 2023 to Winnipeg in exchange for Andrew Copp and this pick.

Round seven
 The Anaheim Ducks' seventh-round pick will go to the Tampa Bay Lightning as the result of a trade on March 24, 2021, that sent Alexander Volkov to Anaheim in exchange for Antoine Morand and this pick (being conditional at the time of the trade). The condition – Tampa Bay will receive a seventh-round pick in 2023 if the pick is available at the time of the selection – was converted when the pick became available after earlier conditional trades with Columbus and Edmonton were resolved on April 8, 2021.
 The Arizona Coyotes' seventh-round pick will go to the Florida Panthers as a result of a trade on July 26, 2021, that sent Anton Stralman, Vladislav Kolyachonok and second-round pick in 2024 to Arizona in exchange for this pick.
 The Florida Panthers' seventh-round pick will go to the Pittsburgh Penguins as the result of a trade on July 8, 2022, that sent a seventh-round pick in 2022 to Florida in exchange for this pick.
 The Los Angeles Kings' seventh-round pick will go to the Boston Bruins as the result of a trade on July 8, 2022, that sent a seventh-round pick in 2022 to Los Angeles in exchange for this pick.
 The Nashville Predators' seventh-round pick will go to the Ottawa Senators as a result of a trade on April 12, 2021, that sent Erik Gudbranson to Nashville in exchange for Brandon Fortunato and this pick.
 The Pittsburgh Penguins' seventh-round pick will go to the San Jose Sharks as the result of a trade on March 3, 2023, that sent Tony Sund to Pittsburgh in exchange for a conditional fifth-round pick in 2024 and this pick.
 The Toronto Maple Leafs' seventh-round pick will go to the Pittsburgh Penguins as the result of a trade on July 17, 2021, that sent Jared McCann to Toronto in exchange for Filip Hallander and this pick.
 The Vancouver Canucks' seventh-round pick will go to the San Jose Sharks as the result of a trade on July 8, 2022, that sent a seventh-round pick in 2022 to Arizona in exchange for this pick.
Arizona previously acquired this pick as the result of a trade on July 23, 2021, that sent Oliver Ekman-Larsson and Conor Garland to Vancouver in exchange for Jay Beagle, Loui Eriksson, Antoine Roussel, a first-round pick in 2021, a second-round pick in 2022 and this pick.

Unresolved conditional draft picks
The following draft picks have been dealt with a condition attached that could not be resolved yet. They are listed below with round, teams, condition itself and further notes, e.g. the players or picks involved in the respective trade.

Broadcasting

In Canada, coverage of the opening round of the draft is scheduled to be televised on Sportsnet and TVA Sports.

In United States, coverage of the opening round of the draft is scheduled to be televised on ESPN.

See also
 2020–21 NHL transactions
 2021–22 NHL transactions
 2022–23 NHL transactions

 List of first overall NHL draft picks
 List of NHL players

References

External links
2023 NHL Entry Draft player stats at The Internet Hockey Database

National Hockey League Entry Draft
Entry Draft
NHL Entry Draft
NHL Entry Draft
21st century in Nashville, Tennessee
Events in Nashville, Tennessee
Ice hockey in Tennessee
NHL

NHL Entry Draft